Henderson is a village in Knox County, Illinois, United States. The population was 255 at the 2010 census, down from 319 at the 2000 census. It is part of the Galesburg Micropolitan Statistical Area.

Geography

Henderson is located in northwestern Knox County at  (41.023857, -90.355684).

Demographics

As of the census of 2000, there were 319 people, 137 households, and 102 families residing in the village. The racial makeup of the village was 97.18% White, 0.94% African American, 0.31% Native American, and 1.57% from two or more races. Hispanic or Latino of any race were 1.88% of the population.

There were 137 households, out of which 20.4% had children under the age of 18 living with them, 62.8% were married couples living together, 8.0% had a female householder with no husband present, and 25.5% were non-families. 21.2% of all households were made up of individuals, and 4.4% had someone living alone who was 65 years of age or older. The average household size was 2.33 and the average family size was 2.60.

In the village, the population was spread out, with 15.7% under the age of 18, 7.2% from 18 to 24, 24.1% from 25 to 44, 36.4% from 45 to 64, and 16.6% who were 65 years of age or older. The median age was 47 years. For every 100 females, there were 101.9 males. For every 100 females age 18 and over, there were 102.3 males.

The median income for a household in the village was $33,636, and the median income for a family was $39,583. Males had a median income of $35,313 versus $24,000 for females. The per capita income for the village was $17,114. About 6.3% of families and 7.9% of the population were below the poverty line, including 3.9% of those under age 18 and 13.3% of those age 65 or over.

References

Villages in Knox County, Illinois
Villages in Illinois
Galesburg, Illinois micropolitan area